Ibrahim Edhem Pasha (1819–1893) was an Ottoman statesman, who held the office of Grand Vizier in the beginning of Abdul Hamid II's reign between 5 February 1877 and 11 January 1878. He resigned from that post after the Ottoman chances on winning the Russo-Turkish War (1877–1878) had decreased. He furthermore served numerous administrative positions in the Ottoman Empire including minister of foreign affairs in 1856, then ambassador to Berlin in 1876, and to Vienna from 1879 to 1882. He also served as a military engineer and as Minister of Interior from 1883 to 1885. In 1876–1877, he represented the Ottoman Government at the Constantinople Conference.

Early life
He was born in Chios of Greek ancestry, in a Christian Greek Orthodox village on the island of Chios. Strangely, his connection to Chios is not well-documented: his son Osman Hamdi Bey claimed that he was a member of the Skaramanga family, but Edhem Pasha himself tried to efface his Greek connections.

As a young boy in 1822, he was orphaned and captured by Ottoman soldiers during the massacre of the Greek population of Chios. He was sold into slavery, brought to Constantinople, and adopted by the (later) grand vizier Hüsrev Pasha. Lacking his own children and family, Hüsrev Pasha raised about ten children who had been orphaned or bought as slaves, many of  whom ascended to important positions.

The child, now named İbrahim Edhem, quickly distinguished himself with his intelligence and after having attended schools in the Ottoman Empire, he was dispatched along with a number of his peers, and under the supervision of his foster father, then grand vizier, and of the sultan Mahmud II himself, to Paris to pursue his studies under state scholarship. There he returned a Bachelor of Arts, and was one of the top pupils at the École des Mines. He was a classmate and a friend of Louis Pasteur. He thus became Turkey's first mining engineer in the modern sense, and he started his career in this field.

Family and legacy
Ibrahim Edhem Pasha was the father of Osman Hamdi Bey, a well-known archaeologist and painter, as well the founder of the Istanbul Archaeology Museum and the Mimar Sinan Fine Arts University. Another son, Halil Edhem Eldem took up the archaeology museum after Osman Hamdi Bey's death and had been a deputy for ten years under the newly founded Turkish Republic. Yet another son, İsmail Galib Bey, is considered as the founder of numismatics as a scientific discipline in Turkey. Later generations of the family also produced illustrious names. The architect Sedat Hakkı Eldem, a cousin, is one of the pillars of the search for modern architectural styles adopted by the Republic of Turkey (called the Republican style in the Turkish context) in its early years and which marks many important buildings dating from the period of the 1920s and the 1930s. A great-grandson, Burak Eldem, is a writer while another, Edhem Eldem, is a renowned historian. More names include Erol Eldem, Tiana Eldem, Levent Eldem and Ercan Eldem, an architect.

See also 
 List of Ottoman grand viziers
 Greek Muslims

References

External links

 
 Chamber of Mining Engineers of Turkey 

1819 births
1893 deaths
19th-century Grand Viziers of the Ottoman Empire
Ambassadors of the Ottoman Empire to Austria-Hungary
Ambassadors of the Ottoman Empire to Germany
Converts to Islam from Eastern Orthodoxy
Former Greek Orthodox Christians
Government ministers of the Ottoman Empire
People from the Ottoman Empire of Greek descent
Turks from the Ottoman Empire
Greek slaves from the Ottoman Empire
Pashas
Politicians from Chios
Greek Muslims
Greek former Christians
Ottoman people of the Russo-Turkish War (1877–1878)
19th-century diplomats
Ministers of Foreign Affairs of the Ottoman Empire
Members of the Senate of the Ottoman Empire